Bílence is a municipality and village in Chomutov District in the Ústí nad Labem Region of the Czech Republic. It has about 200 inhabitants.

Administrative parts
Villages of Škrle and Voděrady are administrative parts of Bílence.

References

Villages in Chomutov District